Agnieszka Radwańska was the defending champion, but chose not to participate that year.

Vera Dushevina won in the final 6–0, 6–1 against Lucie Hradecká.

Seeds

Draw

Finals

Top half

Bottom half

External links
 Main Draw
 Qualifying Draw

Istanbul Cup
İstanbul Cup